Sarcofahrtiopsis is a genus of small flesh flies. Most are known from the Antilles and Central America. Many species feed on semiterrestrial crabs of the genus Cardisoma or are associated with bats.

Species
S. baumhoveri Dodge, 1965
S. capitata Curran, 1928
S. carcini Pape & Mendez, 2002
S. chiriqui Pape & Mendez, 2004
S. cuneata (Townsend, 1935)
S. kuna Pape & Mendez, 2004
S. paterna Dodge, 1965
S. piscosa Mendez, Mello-Patiu & Pape, 2008
S. spathor Mello-Patiu & Pape, 2000
S. thyropteronthos Pape, Pechmann & Vonhof, 2002

References

Sarcophagidae
Oestroidea genera